The nineteenth season of Dancing with the Stars, also known as Dancing with the Stars: All Stars 2, premiered on Seven on 20 February 2022.

Following the success of the first All-Stars season, it was announced that the show would return for another season, also featuring former contestants as well as wildcards. The series was again pre-recorded and was filmed at the ICC in Sydney.

Daryl Somers and Sonia Kruger returned as hosts, whilst Todd McKenney, Helen Richey, Paul Mercurio and Mark Wilson returned to the judging panel.

Couples
The line-up was announced on 19 September 2021, consisting of ten former contestants, including four former winners. As well as four wildcard contestants who hadn't previously competed in the show. The line-up also featured Grant Denyer, who won the fourth season and went on host the Channel 10 iteration of the show which lasted two seasons (sixteenth and seventeenth seasons).

Previous seasons

Scoring chart

  indicate the lowest score for each week
  indicate the highest score for each week
  the couple was eliminated that week
  the couple earned immunity, and could not be eliminated
  the returning couple in the bottom two 
  the winning couple
  the runner-up couple
  the third-place couple

Averages 
The extra points from the Rock n' Roll and Charleston Marathon are excluded

Highest and lowest scoring performances 
The best and worst performances in each dance according to the judges' 30-point scale are as follows:

Couples' highest and lowest scoring dances

According to the traditional 30-point scale:

Weekly scores
Unless indicated otherwise, individual judges scores in the charts below (given in parentheses) are listed in this order from left to right: Todd McKenney, Helen Richey, Paul Mercurio, Mark Wilson.

Week 1: First Dances

Running order

Week 2: First Dances

Running order

Week 3

Running order

Dance-Off

 Judges' votes to save
 Wilson: Anthony & Jessica
 Mercurio: Anthony & Jessica
 Richey: Anthony & Jessica
 McKenney: Did not vote, but would have voted to save Anthony & Jessica

Week 4

Running order

Dance-Off

 Judges' votes to save
 Wilson: Deni & Lyu
 Mercurio: Deni & Lyu
 Richey: Sam & Ruby
 McKenney: Deni & Lyu

Week 5: Semifinals: Night 1

Running order

Dance-Off

 Judges' votes to save
 Wilson: Kris & Siobhan
 Mercurio: Anthony & Jessica
 Richey: Kylie & Aric
 McKenney: Kris & Siobhan

Week 6: Semifinals: Night 2

Running order

Dance-Off

 Judges' votes to save
 Wilson: Olympia & Gustavo
 Mercurio: Olympia & Gustavo
 Richey: Deni & Lyu
 McKenney: Deni & Lyu

Week 7: Grand Finale
The judges' votes had no effect on deciding the winner, who was determined by audience votes.
Running order

Dance chart 
The celebrities and professional partners danced one of these routines for each corresponding week:
 Week 1: Cha-cha-cha, Viennese Waltz, Foxtrot or Tango 
 Week 2: Cha-cha-cha, Samba, Tango, Jive or Argentine Tango
 Week 3: Jive, Viennese Waltz, Paso Doble, Jazz or Samba 
 Week 4:  Paso Doble, Argentine Tango, Foxtrot, Samba, Quickstep or Jive
 Week 5: Semifinals night 1
 Week 6: Semifinals night 2
 Week 7: Grand Finale

 Highest scoring dance
 Lowest scoring dance
 Not performed or scored
 Won Immunity challenge
 Won Dance Off
 Lost Dance Off

Ratings
 Colour key:
  – Highest rating episode and week during the series
  – Lowest rating episode and week during the series

References

Notes 

Season 19
2022 Australian television seasons